Ladislav Vycpálek (Vršovice, Prague, 23 February 1882 – Prague, 9 January 1969) was a Czech composer and violist.

Vycpálek studied composition under Vítězslav Novák. However, he very soon found his own expressive style. He mainly composed vocal and choral works. Prior to World War I, he occupied himself with setting Czech and German symbolist poetry to music, then he drew inspiration from folk poetry. After the war, he turned towards a more humanistic philosophical reflection, creating three well-known cantatas: Cantata of the Last Things of Man (1920–22), Blessed Be Man (1933), and the Czech Requiem (1940).

Selected works
Orchestral
  (The Maid of Lochroyan), Melodrama on an Old Scotch Ballad for narrator and orchestra (or piano), Op. 2 (1907, revised 1911); Czech translation by Ladislav Quis
  (Sursum corda; Courage, My Heart!), 2 Fantasy Variations on Hussite Church Tunes, Op. 30 (1950)

Chamber music
 String Quartet in C major, Op. 3 (1909)
  (In Praise of the Violin), Sonata in D in the Form of Variations for violin, piano and mezzo-soprano, Op. 19 (1927–1928)
 Duo for violin and viola, Op. 20 (1929)
  (Suite for Solo Viola), Op. 21 (1929)
  (Suite for Solo Violin), Op. 22 (1930)
 Sonatina for violin and piano, Op. 26 (1947)
 Con moto for violin and piano (1965)

Piano
 Cestou (On the Way; On the Path), 6 Miniatures, Op. 9 (1911–1914)
     
     Polka
      (Lullaby)
     Praeludium
     Fughetta
     Epilog
  (At Home: A Simple Suite for a Simple Family), Op. 38 (1959)

Vocal
  (Silent Reconciliation; Quiet Conciliation), 4 Songs for voice and piano, Op. 1 (1908–1909)
     Anemone
     Tuberosy
     
     
  (Lights in the Darkness), 3 Songs for voice and piano, Op. 4 (1910); words by Antonín Sova
  (Anticipations and Visions), 5 Songs for voice and piano, Op. 5 (1910–1911); words by Alfred Mombert
     
     
     
     
     
  (Celebration of Life), Cycle of 4 Songs for medium voice and piano, Op. 8 (1912–1913); words by Richard Dehmel
  (From Moravia), 7 Folk Songs for voice and piano, Op. 11a (1910–1914)
     
     
     
     
     
     
     
  (Moravian Ballads) for medium voice and piano, Op. 12 (1915)
     
     
     
     
     
  (War), Cycle of 10 Moravian Folk Songs for voice and piano, Op. 13 (1915)
     
     
     
     
     
     
     
     
     
     
  (In God's Hands), Cycle of 4 Songs for medium voice and piano, Op. 14 (1916); words by Valery Bryusov in translation by Petr Křička
     
     
     
     
  (Awakening), 2 Songs for soprano and orchestra, Op. 17 (1926); words by Karel Toman and the composer
      (March)
      (Prayer for Life's Journey)
  (At Parting), 6 Mourning Songs for voice and piano, Op. 25 (1945)
     
     
     
     
     
     

Choral
  (3 Mixed Choruses), Op. 6 (1911–1912); words by Otokar Březina, Richard Dehmel and Johann Wolfgang von Goethe
     
     
     
  (4 Male Choruses), Op. 7; words by Otokar Březina, Otakar Theer and Richard Dehmel
     
     
     
     
  (The Vagabonds) for male chorus and woodwind ensemble (flute, oboe, 2 clarinets, English horn, 2 bassoons) ad libitum, Op. 10 (1914); words by Karel Toman
  (3 Choruses), Op. 11b
      (The Orphan), Folk Song for mixed chorus and strings (3 violas and cello), or for mixed chorus and cello (1914, revised 1917–1918)
     , Folk Song for female chorus and piano (1915)
      (The Beauty), Folk Song for male chorus a cappella (1915)
  (2 Choruses), Op. 15 (1918); words by Pablo Neruda
      (Our Spring) for mixed chorus a cappella
      (The Present Fight) for male chorus a cappella
  (The Last Things of Man; Cantata of the Last Things of Man; Cantata on the Final Days of Mankind), Cantata for soprano, bass, chorus and orchestra, Op. 16 (1920–1922)
 In Memoriam (5. III. 1924), 3 Male Choruses (a cappella), Op. 18 (1925); words by Jaroslav Vrchlický, Michelangelo and Otakar Theer
  (Blessed Be Man), Cantata for soloists, chorus and orchestra, Op. 23 (1933); words from the Book of Psalms
  (Czech Requiem: Death and Redemption) for soprano, alto, baritone, chorus and orchestra, Op. 24 (1940)
 From the Czech Homeland for mixed chorus a cappella, Op. 29 (1949)
 Out of the Depths for mixed chorus a cappella, Op. 31 (1950)
  (July) for mixed chorus a cappella, Op. 32 (1951, revised 1953); words by Karel Toman
  (August) for mixed chorus a cappella, Op. 33 (1951, revised 1953); words by Karel Toman
  (Vain Love), 5 Songs for female chorus a cappella, Op. 34 (1954)
  (2 Duets) for female chorus and chamber orchestra, Op. 35 (1956)
     
     
  (Saint Luke) for female chorus and chamber orchestra, Op. 36 (1956)
  (The Voice of Bezruč), 3 Male Choruses, Op. 37 (1958)
 A Clumsy Fellow for female chorus and piano, Op. 39 (1960–1961)
 Oh Love! for mixed chorus a cappella, Op. 40 (1961–1962)
 Czech Songs for female chorus and piano, Op. 41 (1961–1962)

Discography
 Karel Ančerl Gold Edition, Vol. 21: Czech Requiem, Op. 24 – Mariana Řeháková (soprano); Marie Mrázová (alto); Theodor Šrubař (baritone); Karel Ančerl (conductor); Czech Philharmonic Orchestra; recorded 1968; Supraphon SU 3681-2 212 (1970, 1992, 2003)
 Karel Ančerl Gold Edition, Vol. 35: Cantata of the Last Things of Man, Op. 16 – Drahomíra Tikalová (soprano); Ladislav Mráz (baritone); Karel Ančerl (conductor); Czech Philharmonic Orchestra; Prague Philharmonic Chorus; recorded 1957; Supraphon SU 3695-2 901 (1959, 1970, 2004)
 Czech Mates – Duo for Violin and Viola, Op. 20 – Duo Patterson: Ronald Patterson (violin), Roxanna Patterson (viola); Ante Aeternum Records (2004)
 Monologue – Suite for Solo Viola, Op. 21 – Jitka Hosprová (viola); Supraphon SU 4049-2 131 (2003)
  – Sonata in D "" for violin, piano and mezzo-soprano, Op. 19 – Soňa Červená (mezzo-soprano); Spytihněv Šorm (violin); Alfred Holeček (piano); recorded 1960s; SU 3851-2 201 (2005)
  (Contemporary Works for Violin): Sonatina, Op. 26 and Con moto – Břetislav Ludvík (violin); Josef Hála (piano); recorded 1971; Panton (1972)

External links

Ladislav Vycpálek biography and photos at Národní knihovna České republiky (National Library of the Czech Republic) 

1882 births
1969 deaths
Czech classical composers
Czech male classical composers
Czech classical violists
20th-century Czech male musicians
20th-century violists